The 1924 Utah gubernatorial election was held on November 4, 1924. Democratic nominee George Dern defeated incumbent Republican Charles R. Mabey with 52.99% of the vote.

General election

Candidates
George Dern, Democratic
Charles R. Mabey, Republican

Results

References

1924
Utah
Gubernatorial